Leadhills railway station was opened on 1 October 1901 as the intermediate stop on the Leadhills and Wanlockhead Light Railway and served the lead mining area, farms and the village of Leadhills circa  WSW of Elvanfoot railway station in South Lanarkshire until 2 January 1939 for passengers and freight. Until Wanlockhead station opened Leadhills was the highest standard gauge adhesion station in the United Kingdom.

History
Operated by the Caledonian Railway, it became part of the London, Midland and Scottish Railway during the Grouping of 1923. The line had been closed and lifted before the Scottish Region of British Railways came into existence upon nationalisation in 1948. The line suffered greatly from the closure of the lead mines and passenger traffic was slight, although the station was located conveniently near to the small village. Coal traffic had continued to the end.

Infrastructure

To save on costs the passenger stations at Leadhills and Wanlockhead had only slightly raised platforms and therefore passenger carriages had three levels of step board fitted which folded down to enable passengers to board and depart.

This platform at Leadhills was demarcated by a wooden fence and a passing loop of  length with catch points was provided as was a three ton capacity crane. A siding served a loading bank and another the goods shed.  The waiting room, stationmaster's office, ticket office and men's toilet were located in a wooden lean-to building built along the long side of the goods shed. No signals were present, however a telephone was provided. and the points were worked by ground frames in the absence of a signal box.

The engine shed and water tower stood to the east,  from Elvanfoot.

The site today
The track had already been lifted by April 1939 and the buildings demolished. The Leadhills and Wanlockhead Railway narrow gauge line and station have been constructed on the site of the old station and its trackbed.

References

Notes

Sources 
 
 Ireland, Alastair (2011). The Leadhills and Wanlockhead Railway. Kelso : Alastair Ireland .
 Thomas, J. (1971). Scotland: the lowlands and borders. A regional history of the railways V.6. Newton Abbot.
 Wham, Alasdair (2017). Exploring Dumfries & Galloway's Lost Railway Heritage. A Walker's Guide. Catrine : Oakwood Press .
 Wignall, C.J. (1983). Complete British Railways Maps and Gazetteer From 1830-1981. Oxford : Oxford Publishing Co. .

External links
 Leadhills station on the Leadhills & Wanlockhead Railway.

Railway stations in Great Britain opened in 1901
Railway stations in Great Britain closed in 1939
Former Caledonian Railway stations